Dillahunt is a surname. Notable people with the surname include: 

Ellis Dillahunt (born 1964), American football player
Garret Dillahunt (born 1964), American actor
Tawanna Dillahunt, American computer scientist